Zhunti Daoren (准提道人) is a character from the Chinese classic novel Fengshen Yanyi. He is a heavenly saint come from the Western Heaven, the land of Buddha. His rank is high and equal with Taishang Laojun and Yuanshi Tianzun from the East. Zhunti Daoren is the brother of Jieyin Daoren. He carried the wisdom from the West and teachings of the Buddha's laws together with his brother and enlightened the people of the Shang Dynasty. He once rushed from the West to the East to help Jiang Ziya conquer the peacock spirit Kong Xuan as a mount, and later transformed him into Mahamayuri. He also once subdued Ma Yuan, who had eaten human's hearts, brought back to the Western Heaven and transformed into Ma Yuan Zunwang Buddha (马元尊王佛).

Origin
Zhunti Daoren is basically inherited the image of Cundi Bodhisattva in the Chinese translation of Buddhist scriptures. In addition, the Western religion was born out of the Buddhist Pure land beliefs, so it was widely used at that time. Zhunti is the second leader of Western religion in the faith of Pure land.

References

Chinese gods
Buddhism in China
Investiture of the Gods characters